El Mundo Árabe is a newspaper of Arab culture in Chile.

History
El Mundo Árabe was founded by Jorge Sabaj Zurob, a Palestinian immigrant, in 1931.  During World War II, it was banned by the Allied Forces because it published Nazi propaganda. In 1949, it was again accused of stoking anti-semitic sentiment in Chile.

In 2014, the Senate of Chile celebrated its 82nd anniversary, with Eugenio Tuma and Francisco Chahuán, two senators of Palestinian descent, speaking about its founder.

References

Newspapers published in Chile
Publications established in 1931
1931 establishments in Chile